Luigi Ferrarese (12 December 1795 – 8 August 1855) was an Italian physician and the leading proponent of phrenology in Italy in the nineteenth century.

Biography
He was born at Brienza, in the province of Potenza, to Nicola and Antonia Contardi. He received his first education in a Piarist school in Naples, studying Italian literature, Greek and Latin. After he graduated in medicine (1817), Ferrarese began to work at the Maddalena lunatic asylum (Aversa) with the noted pioneer of psychiatry Biagio Miraglia, and gave private lessons.

He was a member of several institutions such as the Scientific Academies of Naples, Turin, Bologna, Padua and a corresponding member of the Phrenological Society of Paris. In 1848, he was elected as a deputy for the district of Potenza at the Neapolitan Parliament but, because of his liberal ideas, was constantly overseen by the Bourbon police.

Ferrarese died in 1855, stricken with typhoid fever.

Theories
He published a half dozen works on phrenology (the belief that personality traits could be determined by examining the dimensions of a person's skull) between 1830 and 1838. His chief work on the subject, Memorie Risguardanti La Dottrina Frenologica (1836-8), was "one of the fundamental 19th century works in the field". His work was initially met with approval by the Church. His writings published after his 1838 opus without the necessary permission from the state ran him afoul of ecclesiastical authorities, resulting in persecution, and even imprisonment.

Among his writings, Ferrarese advocated for a government embrace of phrenology as a scientific means of conquering many social ills. An 1835 study of suicide, "Della Monomania Suicida" ("Suicidal Monomania") concluded that government regulations punishing the families of suicides were "absurd and unjust" as they failed to prevent the ill while punishing the innocent. In 1838, in the course of defending his beliefs, Ferrarese was among the earliest persons identified to expressly address and criticize Pandeism: The belief that God became the Universe and that human beings are therefore "fragments" of God. Ferrarese said the theory 'profaned the mysteries of theology'.

In March 1844, Ferrarese was visited by noted Scottish phrenologist George Combe, who had earlier read and been impressed by Ferrarese's Memorie Risguardanti La Dottrina Frenologica. At the time of his initial reading of the work, Combe had written:

On his visit to Naples, Combe reported first a difficulty in finding Ferrarese and discovered the doctor to living in obscurity. Combe described the situation:

On a second visit, Combe ascertained the cause of Ferrarese's depressed condition:

Works
Delle malattie della mente ovvero delle diverse specie di follie: Vol.1 (1830)
Delle malattie della mente ovvero delle diverse specie di follie: Vol.2 (1832)
Della monomania suicida (1835)
Memorie risguardanti la dottrina frenologica (1838)
Opuscoli sopra svariati scientifici argomenti (1838)
Ricerche intorno all'origine dell'istinto (1838)
Quistioni medico-legali intorno alle diverse specie di follie (1843)
Nuove ricerche di sublime Psicologia medico-forense (1845)

References

Phrenologists
People from Brienza
Italian psychiatrists
1795 births
1855 deaths